Oneop is an island in the outer islands of MORTLOCK.  and municipality in the state of Chuuk, Federated States of Micronesia.

References

Municipalities of Chuuk State
Islands of Chuuk State